Sofía Varela Espinoza (born 28 March 1998) is a Costa Rican footballer who plays as a forward for Mexican Liga MX Femenil club Santos Laguna and the Costa Rica women's national team.

References

External links
 
 
 

1998 births
Living people
People from San Carlos (canton)
Costa Rican women's footballers
Women's association football forwards
Deportivo Saprissa players
Santos Laguna (women) players
Liga MX Femenil players
Costa Rica women's international footballers
Footballers at the 2019 Pan American Games
Medalists at the 2019 Pan American Games
Pan American Games bronze medalists for Costa Rica
Pan American Games medalists in football
Costa Rican expatriate footballers
Costa Rican expatriate sportspeople in Mexico
Expatriate women's footballers in Mexico